Robin Griffith-Jones  (born 1956) is a  Church of England priest, Master of the Temple in London and a lecturer at King's College, London.

Griffith-Jones was educated at Westminster School and New College, Oxford, before working at Christie's for some years. He is a fellow of the Society of Antiquaries of London.

In 1999, Griffith-Jones was appointed Master of the Temple in London, the title given to the senior cleric of the Temple Church. His official style is currently "The Reverend and Valiant Master of the Temple"; this is not used on the official website but is confirmed by the Middle Temple website and has been used by him in interviews. Prior to this he was chaplain of Lincoln College, Oxford, from 1992 to 1999 and a curate in Liverpool from 1989 to 1992.

He is the son of Mervyn Griffith-Jones, who was the prosecutor at the Lady Chatterley trial and the Common Serjeant of London at The Old Bailey.

In December 2015 he appeared on the BBC's The Sky at Night, when the programme's topic was about the Star of Bethlehem, talking to Dallas Campbell.

He is the brother of John Griffith-Jones.

Books 
2000: The Four Witnesses: The Rebel, the Rabbi, the Chronicler, and the Mystic. San Francisco: HarperSanFrancisco 
2004: The Gospel According to Paul: The Creative Genius Who Brought Jesus to the World. San Francisco: HarperSanFrancisco 
2006: The Da Vinci Code and the Secrets of the Temple: The Master of The Temple. Norwich: Canterbury Press 
2008: Mary Magdalene: The Woman whom Jesus Loved. Norwich: Canterbury Press

References

External links
List of publications

1956 births
Living people
Alumni of New College, Oxford
20th-century English Anglican priests
21st-century English Anglican priests
English religious writers
Fellows of Lincoln College, Oxford
Fellows of the Society of Antiquaries of London
People educated at Westminster School, London
Academics of King's College London
Masters of the Temple